Kaoru Ishiguro (born 6 May 1933) is a Japanese wrestler. He competed in the men's freestyle heavyweight at the 1960 Summer Olympics.

References

External links
 

1933 births
Living people
Japanese male sport wrestlers
Olympic wrestlers of Japan
Wrestlers at the 1960 Summer Olympics
Sportspeople from Hokkaido
20th-century Japanese people